Per Olsson Fridh (born 27 June 1981) is a Swedish politician for the Green Party. He served as Minister for International Development Cooperation from February to November 2021. 

He previously served as state secretary to Alice Bah Kuhnke, the Minister of Culture and Democracy, from 2014 to 2019 and then as state secretary to Peter Eriksson, the Minister for International Development Cooperation, from 2019 until his own appointment as cabinet minister.

Personal life 
Olsson Fridh grew up in Lomma and in Malmö. He is married to Madeleine Kaharascho Fridh, a Feminist Inititative politician who is serving on the Stockholm City Council.

Career 
Olsson Fridh has previously served as the Chairman of the Stockholm chapter of the Green Party. He was elected to the Riksdag following the 2014 general election but was appointed State Secretary to Alice Bah Kuhnke, the Minister of Culture and Democracy, a few weeks later.

Other activities 
 Joint World Bank-IMF Development Committee, Alternate Member

References

|-

|-

1981 births
Swedish Ministers for International Development Cooperation
Living people